Zero Mile or variation, may refer to:

Distances
Zero milepost, the origination point for measuring distances in a jurisdiction or on a route
 Zero Milestone, a zero mile marker monument in Washington, D.C.
 Zero Mile Stone (Nagpur), a monument locating the geographical center of colonial India in the city of Nagpur, Maharashtra, India
 Zero Mile metro station, Nagpur, Maharashtra, India
 Atlanta Zero Mile Post, Georgia, USA

Other uses
 0 Mile (2017 song) by Korean boy band NCT 127 off their record Cherry Bomb (EP)

See also
M-153 (Michigan highway) or Ford Road, which serves as the zero-mile line for the Detroit area's Mile Road System
 Mile Road System (Michigan)
 Mile Road System (Detroit)
Zero (disambiguation)
Milestone (disambiguation)
Stone (disambiguation)
Mile (disambiguation)
Kilometre zero (disambiguation)